The Peugeot 201 is a car produced by Peugeot between 1929 and 1937.

The car was manufactured at the company's Sochaux plant near the Swiss frontier, and is today celebrated in the adjacent Peugeot museum. Although Peugeot had produced a petrol/gasoline-powered motor vehicle as early as 1886, the Peugeot 201 may reasonably be seen as the company's first mass-produced model.

History
The Peugeot 201 was presented at the 1929 Paris Motor Show with the backdrop of the Wall Street Crash. While many European manufacturers did not survive the ensuing depression, the 201's image as an inexpensive car helped Peugeot to survive the economic crisis with its finances intact and its status as a major auto producer confirmed.

Models
During the 1930s Peugeot offered several variants of the 201, with increasing engine capacity.

Initially, it was powered by a 1122 cc engine developing  at 3500 rpm (top speed: 80 km/h / 50 mph).

The Peugeot 201C, launched in 1931, is claimed to be the first mass-produced car equipped with independent front suspension, a concept rapidly adopted by the competition. The simpler beam front axle version remained available, but the independent suspension system reportedly improved road holding and reduced steering column vibration.

Naming
In the early twentieth century, car manufacturers paid little attention to the naming of their vehicles.  The 201's predecessor, the Type 190, is so named because it was the 190th distinct design developed by Peugeot. However, at the time few customers would have been aware of the name "Type 190". Even in the company's own brochures, the car now known as the Type 190 was simply called "La 5CV Peugeot" (The Peugeot 5 hp).

For Peugeot, a new naming scheme was introduced when the Type 190 was replaced by Peugeot 201.  The 201 was the first Peugeot to carry a name comprising three numerals with a central zero, a naming scheme continued with the 301 and 401. Peugeot took effective steps to protect all such automobile names, to the discomfiture of Porsche in the 1960s as they prepared to launch their new 901 model. Curiously, the name of the Ferrari 308 was not a problem.

Light commercials
Between 1931 and 1933 the company produced 1,676 commercial versions of the 201, aimed at small shopkeepers and other businessmen. A wide range of body types was produced including a flatbed truck, a "bakers' van" and light vans with and without side windows behind the B-pillar.

Sources

 Auto passion, nbr 37, juillet 1990
 Rétro hebdo, nbr 28, septembre 1997
 Rétroviseur , nbr 58

Cars introduced in 1929
201
1930s cars